The Tacoma Building was an early skyscraper in Chicago. Completed in 1889, it was the first major building designed by the architectural firm Holabird & Roche. The Tacoma Building was demolished in 1929 to be replaced by One North LaSalle.

A pioneering building of the Chicago School, it uses a framework of iron and steel constructed by George A. Fuller with, for the first time, all its members fixed together by rivets. While internally still supported by load-bearing walls, the two facades towards LaSalle Street and Madison Street are true curtain walls. With this, Holabird & Roche's structure went beyond William LeBaron Jenney's solution for his Home Insurance Building.

After investigating the lost Chicago landmark, the National Association of Building Owners and Managers diagnosed the cause of its obsolescence to be the building's inefficient layout.

See also
 Early skyscrapers

Notes

References 
Blaser, Werner.  Chicago Architecture: Holabird & Root, 1880-1992.  Basel; Boston: Birkhauser Verlag, 1992.
Bruegmann, Robert.  Holabird & Roche/Holabird & Root: An Illustrated Catalog of Works, 1880-1940.  New York: Garland Publishing, 1991.
Bruegmann, Robert.  The Architects and the City: Holabird & Roche of Chicago, 1880-1918.  Chicago: University of Chicago Press, 1997.

Chicago school architecture in Illinois
Projects by Holabird & Root
Skyscraper office buildings in Chicago
1889 establishments in Illinois
1929 disestablishments in Illinois
Buildings and structures completed in 1889
Buildings and structures demolished in 1929